Salehabad Rural District is in Golestan District of Baharestan County, Tehran province, Iran. At the National Census of 2006, its population (as a part of Robat Karim County) was 722 in 173 households. There were 983 inhabitants in 275 households at the following census of 2011, by which time the district, together with Bostan District, had been separated from the county and Baharestan County established. At the most recent census of 2016, the population of the rural district was 1,134 in 350 households. Its only village is Emamzadeh Baqer, with 1,134 people.

References 

Baharestan County

Rural Districts of Tehran Province

Populated places in Tehran Province

Populated places in Baharestan County